Mike O'Brien is the former president and co-founder of ArenaNet and executive producer of its games Guild Wars and Guild Wars 2. He led the design and content creation teams of the original Guild Wars.

Before co-founding ArenaNet, he worked as a company director and a lead programmer at Blizzard Entertainment where he developed the 3D rendering engine of Warcraft III: Reign of Chaos and led the development of Battle.net. He also worked on Warcraft II: Tides of Darkness, Diablo and StarCraft, where he, among other things, designed and created the MPQ archives used in all Blizzard games after Diablo. Mike O'Brien was featured as one of the most influential people in the video game industry on PC Gamer's September 1999 cover story "Game Gods".

O'Brien also previously developed an Apple II emulator for Windows, AppleWin, and old DOS ASCII game, Pyro 2.

In early October 2019, through the official Guild Wars 2 news page, O'Brien announced his departure from ArenaNet and his intention to start a new development studio. He is currently working as a programmer at the studio "ManaWorks".

References

Year of birth missing (living people)
Living people
Video game programmers
Video game designers
Place of birth missing (living people)